Fear God is an American Christian punk and Christian rock musical project, and the project primarily play punk rock. The project come from Orange County, California, while this project was started, in 2012, by Doug Jutras. The projects first release, with Thumper Punk Records, God Bless the World, Not Just America, a studio album, was released in 2012.

Background
Fear God is a Christian punk and Christian rock musical project from Orange, California, where the only member is Doug Jutras.

Music history
The musical project commenced as a musical entity in 2012, with their first release, God Bless the World, Not Just America, a studio album, that was released on November 20, 2012 by Thumper Punk Records. Jutras released, Miss That Walk, an extended play, on December 9, 2014, with Thumper Punk Records.

Members
Current members
 Doug Jutras

Discography
Studio albums
 God Bless the World, Not Just America (November 20, 2012, Thumper Punk)
EPs
 Miss That Walk (December 9, 2014, Thumper Punk)

References

External links
Official website

Musical groups from California
2012 establishments in California
Musical groups established in 2012